Yo Soy La Bomba  is an album by Puerto Rican merenguero Ashley, literally meaning "I'm The Bomb" in Spanish. The debut album went Gold and Platinum in sales.

Track listing 
 "'Yo Soy La Bomba"
 "Ese Moreno"
 "Mi Novio Se Curó"
 "El Truco" written by - ynercido Dilone 
 "Yo Tengo Un Ritmo"
 "Dónde Estás Corazón"
 "Mujer De Un Solo Hombre"
 "Secretaria"

Ashley (singer) albums
1997 albums